The Accounting Historians Journal is a biannual peer-reviewed academic journal published by the Academy of Accounting Historians. It is abstracted and indexed in Scopus. The journal was established in 1977, as a successor of The Accounting Historian, a quarterly newsletter published by the Academy of Accounting Historians between 1974 and 1976. The original newsletters were collected and published in 1981 as volumes 1 to 3 of the Accounting Historians Journal.

References

External links 
 

Accounting journals
Biannual journals
English-language journals
Publications established in 1974
Academic journals published by learned and professional societies
History of accounting